Elbridge Gerry (July 17, 1744 – November 23, 1814) was an American Founding Father, merchant, politician, and diplomat who served as the fifth vice president of the United States under President James Madison from 1813 until his death in 1814. The political practice of gerrymandering is named after him. 

Born into a wealthy merchant family, Gerry vocally opposed British colonial policy in the 1760s and was active in the early stages of organizing the resistance in the American Revolutionary War.  Elected to the Second Continental Congress, Gerry signed both the Declaration of Independence and Articles of Confederation.  He was one of three men who attended the Constitutional Convention in 1787, but refused to sign the Constitution because originally it did not include a Bill of Rights. After its ratification, he was elected to the inaugural United States Congress, where he was actively involved in the drafting and passage of the Bill of Rights as an advocate of individual and state liberties.

Gerry was at first opposed to the idea of political parties and cultivated enduring friendships on both sides of the political divide between Federalists and Democratic-Republicans.  He was a member of a diplomatic delegation to France that was treated poorly in the XYZ Affair, in which Federalists held him responsible for a breakdown in negotiations. Gerry thereafter became a Democratic-Republican, running unsuccessfully for Governor of Massachusetts several times before winning the office in 1810.  During his second term, the legislature approved new state senate districts that led to the coining of the word "gerrymander"; he lost the next election, although the state senate remained Democratic-Republican. Gerry was nominated by the Democratic-Republican party and elected as vice president in the 1812 election. Advanced in age and in poor health, Gerry served 21 months of his term before dying in office. He is the only signatory of the Declaration of Independence buried in Washington, D.C.

Early life and education
Gerry was born on July 17, 1744, in the North Shore town of Marblehead, Massachusetts.  His father, Thomas Gerry, was a merchant operating ships out of Marblehead, and his mother, Elizabeth (Greenleaf) Gerry, was the daughter of a successful Boston merchant. Gerry's first name came from John Elbridge, one of his mother's ancestors. Gerry's parents had 11 children in all, although only five survived to adulthood.  Of these, Elbridge was the third. He was first educated by private tutors and entered Harvard College shortly before turning 14. After receiving a Bachelor of Arts in 1762 and a Master of Arts in 1765, he entered his father's merchant business.  By the 1770s, the Gerrys numbered among the wealthiest Massachusetts merchants, with trading connections in Spain, the West Indies, and along the North American coast. Gerry's father, who had emigrated from England in 1730, was active in local politics and had a leading role in the local militia.

Early political career
Gerry was from an early time a vocal opponent of Parliamentary efforts to tax the colonies after the French and Indian War ended in 1763.  In 1770, he sat on a Marblehead committee that sought to enforce importation bans on taxed British goods. He frequently communicated with other Massachusetts opponents of British policy, including Samuel Adams, John Adams, Mercy Otis Warren, and others.

In May 1772, he won election to the Great and General Court of the Province of Massachusetts Bay (its legislative assembly).  There he worked closely with Samuel Adams to advance colonial opposition to Parliamentary colonial policies.  He was responsible for establishing Marblehead's committee of correspondence, one of the first to be set up after that of Boston. However, an incident of mob action prompted him to resign from the committee the next year.  Gerry and other prominent Marbleheaders had established a hospital for performing smallpox inoculations on Cat Island; because the means of transmission of the disease were not known at the time, fears amongst the local population led to protests which escalated into violence that wrecked the facilities and threatened the proprietors' other properties.

Gerry reentered politics after the Boston Port Act closed that city's port in 1774, and Marblehead became an alternative port to which relief supplies from other colonies could be delivered.  As one of the town's leading merchants and Patriots, Gerry played a major role in ensuring the storage and delivery of supplies from Marblehead to Boston, interrupting those activities only to care for his dying father.  He was elected as a representative to the First Continental Congress in September 1774, but declined, still grieving the loss of his father.

Congress and Revolution
Gerry was elected to the provincial assembly, which reconstituted itself as the Massachusetts Provincial Congress after British Governor Thomas Gage dissolved the body in October 1774. He was assigned to its committee of safety, responsible for ensuring that the province's limited supplies of weapons and gunpowder remained out of British Army hands.  His actions were partly responsible for the storage of weapons and ammunition in Concord; these stores were the target of the British raiding expedition that sparked the start of the American Revolutionary War with the Battles of Lexington and Concord in April 1775. (Gerry was staying at an inn at Menotomy, now Arlington, when the British marched through on the night of April 18.) During the Siege of Boston that followed, Gerry continued to take a leading role in supplying the nascent Continental Army, something he would continue to do as the war progressed. He leveraged business contacts in France and Spain to acquire not just munitions, but supplies of all types, and was involved in the transfer of financial subsidies from Spain to Congress.  He sent ships to ports all along the American coast and dabbled in financing privateering operations against British shipping.

Unlike some other merchants, there is no evidence that Gerry profiteered directly from the hostilities (he spoke out against price gouging and in favor of price controls), although his war-related merchant activities notably increased the family's wealth. His gains were tempered to some extent by the precipitous decline in the value of paper currencies, which he held in large quantities and speculated in.

Gerry served in the Second Continental Congress from February 1776 to 1780, when matters of the ongoing war occupied the body's attention.  He was influential in convincing several delegates to support passage of the Declaration of Independence in the debates held during the summer of 1776; John Adams wrote of him, "If every Man here was a Gerry, the Liberties of America would be safe against the Gates of Earth and Hell." He was implicated as a member of the so-called "Conway Cabal", a group of Congressmen and military officers who were dissatisfied with the performance of General George Washington during the 1777 military campaign.  However, Gerry took Pennsylvania leader Thomas Mifflin, one of Washington's critics, to task early in the episode and specifically denied knowledge of any sort of conspiracy against Washington in February 1778.

Gerry's political philosophy was one of limited central government, and he regularly advocated for the maintenance of civilian control of the military. He held these positions fairly consistently throughout his political career (wavering principally on the need for stronger central government in the wake of the 1786–87 Shays' Rebellion) and was well known for his personal integrity. In later years he opposed the idea of political parties, remaining somewhat distant from both the developing Federalist and Democratic-Republican parties until later in his career.  It was not until 1800 that he formally associated with the Democratic-Republicans in opposition to what he saw as attempts by the Federalists to centralize too much power in the national government.

In 1780, he resigned from the Continental Congress over the issue and refused offers from the state legislature to return to the Congress. He also refused appointment to the state senate, claiming he would be more effective in the state's lower chamber, and also refused appointment as a county judge, comparing the offer by Governor John Hancock to those made by royally-appointed governors to benefit their political allies. He was elected a fellow of the American Academy of Arts and Sciences in 1781.

Gerry was convinced to rejoin the Confederation Congress in 1783, when the state legislature agreed to support his call for needed reforms. He served in that body until September 1785, during which time it met in New York City.  The following year he married Ann Thompson, the daughter of a wealthy New York merchant who was twenty years his junior; his best man was his good friend James Monroe. The couple had ten children between 1787 and 1801, straining Ann's health.

The war made Gerry sufficiently wealthy that when it ended he sold off his merchant interests and began investing in land.  In 1787, he purchased the Cambridge, Massachusetts, estate of the last royal lieutenant governor of Massachusetts, Thomas Oliver, which had been confiscated by the state.  This  property, known as Elmwood, became the family home for the rest of Gerry's life. He continued to own property in Marblehead and bought several properties in other Massachusetts communities.  He also owned shares in the Ohio Company, prompting some political opponents to characterize him as an owner of vast tracts of western lands.

Constitutional Convention
Gerry played a major role in the Constitutional Convention, held in Philadelphia during the summer of 1787. In its deliberations, he consistently advocated for a strong delineation between state and federal government powers, with state legislatures shaping the membership of federal government positions. Gerry's opposition to popular election of representatives was rooted in part by the events of Shays' Rebellion in western Massachusetts in the year preceding the convention. Despite that position, he also sought to maintain individual liberties by providing checks on government power that might abuse or limit those freedoms.

He supported the idea that the Senate composition should not be determined by population; the view that it should instead be composed of equal numbers of members for each state prevailed in the Connecticut Compromise. The compromise was adopted on a narrow vote in which the Massachusetts delegation was divided, Gerry and Caleb Strong voting in favor. Gerry further proposed that senators of a state, rather than casting a single vote on behalf of the state, vote instead as individuals. Gerry was also vocal in opposing the Three-fifths Compromise, which counted slaves as three-fifths of a free person for the purposes of apportionment in the House of Representatives, whereas counting each slave individually would have given southern slave states a decided advantage.  Gerry opposed slavery and said the constitution should have "nothing to do" with slavery so as "not to sanction it."

Because of his fear of demagoguery and belief the people of the United States could be easily misled, Gerry also advocated indirect elections. Although he was unsuccessful in obtaining them for the lower house of Congress, Gerry did obtain such indirect elections for the Senate, whose members were to be selected by the state legislatures. Gerry also advanced numerous proposals for indirect elections of the President of the United States, most of them involving limiting the right to vote to the state governors and electors.

Gerry was unhappy about the lack of enumeration of any specific individual liberties in the proposed constitution and generally opposed proposals that strengthened the central government. He was one of only three delegates who voted against the proposed constitution in the convention (the others were George Mason and Edmund Randolph), citing a concern about the convention's lack of authority to enact such major changes to the nation's system of government and to the constitution's lack of "federal features."  Ultimately, Gerry refused to sign because of concerns over the rights of private citizens and the power of the legislature to raise armies and revenue.

State ratification and Bill of Rights
During the ratification debates that took place in the states following the convention, Gerry continued his opposition, publishing a widely circulated letter documenting his objections to the proposed constitution. In the document, he cites the lack of a Bill of Rights as his primary objection but also expresses qualified approval of the Constitution, indicating that he would accept it with some amendment. Strong pro-Constitution forces attacked him in the press, comparing him unfavorably to the Shaysites. Henry Jackson was particularly vicious: "[Gerry has] done more injury to this country by that infamous Letter than he will be able to make atonement in his whole life", and Oliver Ellsworth, a convention delegate from Connecticut, charged him with deliberately courting the Shays faction.

One consequence of the furor over his letter was that he was not selected as a delegate to the Massachusetts ratifying convention although he was later invited to attend by the convention's leadership. The convention leadership was dominated by Federalists, and Gerry was not given any formal opportunity to speak. He left the convention after a shouting match with convention chair Francis Dana. Massachusetts ratified the constitution by a vote of 187 to 168. The debate had the result of estranging Gerry from several previously-friendly politicians, including chairman Dana and Rufus King.

United States House of Representatives
Anti-Federalist forces nominated Gerry for governor in 1788, but he was predictably defeated by the popular incumbent John Hancock. Following its ratification, Gerry recanted his opposition to the Constitution, noting that other state ratifying conventions had called for amendments that he supported. He was nominated by friends (over his own opposition to the idea) for a seat in the inaugural House of Representatives, where he served two terms.

In June 1789, Gerry proposed that Congress consider all of the proposed constitutional amendments that various state ratifying conventions had called for (notably those of Rhode Island and North Carolina, which had at the time still not ratified the Constitution). In the debate that followed, he led opposition to some of the proposals, arguing that they did not go far enough in ensuring individual liberties.  He successfully lobbied for inclusion of freedom of assembly in the First Amendment and was a leading architect of the Fourth Amendment protections against search and seizure. He sought unsuccessfully to insert the word "expressly" into the Tenth Amendment, which might have more significantly limited the federal government's power.

He was successful in efforts to severely limit the federal government's ability to control state militias. In tandem with this protection, he had once argued against the idea of the federal government controlling a large standing army, saying, "A standing army is like a standing member. It's an excellent assurance of domestic tranquility, but a dangerous temptation to foreign adventure."

Gerry vigorously supported Alexander Hamilton's reports on public credit, including the assumption at full value of state debts, and supported Hamilton's Bank of the United States, positions consistent with earlier calls he had made for economic centralization. Although he had speculated in depreciated Continental bills of credit (the IOUs at issue), there is no evidence he participated in large-scale speculation that attended the debate when it took place in 1790, and he became a major investor in the new bank. He used the floor of the House to speak out against aristocratic and monarchical tendencies he saw as threats to republican ideals, and generally opposed laws and their provisions that he perceived as limiting individual and state liberties.  He opposed any attempt to give officers of the executive significant powers, specifically opposing establishment of the Treasury Department because its head might gain more power than the president. He opposed measures that strengthened the presidency (such as the ability to fire Cabinet officers), seeking instead to give the legislature more power over appointments.

Gerry did not stand for re-election in 1792, returning home to raise his children and care for his sickly wife. He agreed to serve as a presidential elector for John Adams in the 1796 election. During Adams' term in office, Gerry maintained good relations with both Adams and Vice President Thomas Jefferson, hoping that the divided executive might lead to less friction.  His hopes were not realized: the split between Federalists (Adams) and Democratic-Republicans (Jefferson) widened.

XYZ Affair

President Adams appointed Gerry to be a member of a special diplomatic commission sent to Republican France in 1797. Tensions had risen between the two nations after the 1796 ratification of the Jay Treaty, made between the United States and Great Britain.  It was seen by French leaders as signs of an Anglo-American alliance, and France had consequently stepped up seizures of American ships. Adams chose Gerry, over his cabinet's opposition (on political grounds that Gerry was insufficiently Federalist), because of their long-standing relationship; Adams described Gerry as one of the "two most impartial men in America" (Adams himself being the other).

Gerry joined co-commissioners Charles Cotesworth Pinckney and John Marshall in France in October 1797 and met briefly with Foreign Minister Talleyrand. Some days after that meeting, the delegation was approached by three French agents (at first identified as "X", "Y", and "Z" in published papers, leading the controversy to be called the "XYZ Affair") who demanded substantial bribes from the commissioners before negotiations could continue. The commissioners refused and sought unsuccessfully to engage Talleyrand in formal negotiations. Believing Gerry to be the most approachable of the commissioners, Talleyrand successively froze first Pinckney and then Marshall out of the informal negotiations, and they left France in April 1798. Gerry, who sought to leave with them, stayed behind because Talleyrand threatened war if he left. Gerry refused to make any significant negotiations afterward and left Paris in August.

By then, dispatches describing the commission's reception had been published in the United States, raising calls for war. The undeclared naval Quasi-War (1798–1800) followed. Federalists, notably Secretary of State Timothy Pickering, accused Gerry of supporting the French and abetting the breakdown of the talks, while Adams and Republicans such as Thomas Jefferson supported him. The negative press damaged Gerry's reputation, and he was burned in effigy by protestors in front of his home. He was only later vindicated, when his correspondence with Talleyrand was published in 1799. In response to the Federalist attacks on him, and because of his perception that the Federalist-led military buildup threatened republican values, Gerry formally joined the Democratic-Republican Party in early 1800, standing for election as Governor of Massachusetts.

Governor of Massachusetts
For years, Gerry unsuccessfully sought the governorship of Massachusetts. His opponent in these races, Caleb Strong, was a popular moderate Federalist, whose party dominated the state's politics despite a national shift toward the Republicans. In 1803, Republicans in the state were divided, and Gerry only had regional support of the party.  He decided not to run in 1804, returning to semi-retirement and to deal with a personal financial crisis.  His brother Samuel Russell had mismanaged his own business affairs, and Gerry had propped him up by guaranteeing a loan that was due.  The matter ultimately ruined Gerry's finances for his remaining years.

Republican James Sullivan won the governor's seat from Strong in 1807, but his successor was unable to hold the seat in the 1809 election, which went to Federalist Christopher Gore. Gerry stood for election again in 1810 against Gore and won a narrow victory.  Republicans cast Gore as an ostentatious British-loving Tory who wanted to restore the monarchy (his parents were Loyalists during the Revolution), and Gerry as a patriotic American, while Federalists described Gerry as a "French partizan" and Gore as an honest man devoted to ridding the government of foreign influence. A temporary lessening in the threat of war with Britain aided Gerry. The two battled again in 1811, with Gerry once again victorious in a highly acrimonious campaign.

Gerry's first year as governor was less controversial than his second, because the Federalists controlled the state senate.  He preached moderation in the political discourse, noting that it was important that the nation present a unified front in its dealings with foreign powers. In his second term, with full Republican control of the legislature, he became notably more partisan, purging much of the state government of Federalist appointees. The legislature also enacted "reforms" of the court system that resulted in an increase in the number of judicial appointments, which Gerry filled with Republican partisans. However, infighting within the party and a shortage of qualified candidates played against Gerry, and the Federalists scored points by complaining vocally about the partisan nature of the reforms.

Other legislation passed during Gerry's second year included a bill broadening the membership of Harvard's Board of Overseers to diversify its religious membership, and another that liberalized religious taxes.  The Harvard bill had significant political slant because the recent split between orthodox Congregationalists and Unitarians also divided the state to some extent along party lines, and Federalist Unitarians had recently gained control over the Harvard board.

In 1812, the state adopted new constitutionally mandated electoral district boundaries.  The Republican-controlled legislature had created district boundaries designed to enhance their party's control over state and national offices, leading to some oddly shaped legislative districts. Although Gerry was unhappy about the highly partisan districting (according to his son-in-law, he thought it "highly disagreeable"), he signed the legislation.  The shape of one of the state senate districts in Essex County was compared to a salamander by a local Federalist newspaper in a political cartoon, calling it a "Gerry-mander". Ever since, the creation of such districts has been called gerrymandering.

Gerry also engaged in partisan investigations of potential libel against him by elements of the Federalist press, further damaging his popularity with moderates.  The redistricting controversy, along with the libel investigation and the impending War of 1812, contributed to Gerry's defeat in 1812 (once again at the hands of Caleb Strong, whom the Federalists had brought out of retirement). The gerrymandering of the state Senate was a notable success in the 1812 election: the body was thoroughly dominated by Republicans, even though the house and the governor's seat went to Federalists by substantial margins.

Vice presidency and death
Gerry's financial difficulties prompted him to ask President James Madison for a federal position after his loss in the 1812 election (which was held early in the year). He was chosen by the party Congressional nominating caucus to be Madison's vice presidential running mate in the 1812 presidential election, although the nomination was first offered to John Langdon.  He was viewed as a relatively safe choice who would attract Northern votes but not pose a threat to James Monroe, who was thought likely to succeed Madison.  Madison narrowly won re-election, and Gerry took the oath of office at Elmwood in March 1813. At that time the office of vice president was largely a sinecure; Gerry's duties included advancing the administration's agenda in Congress and dispensing patronage positions in New England. Gerry's actions in support of the War of 1812 had a partisan edge: he expressed concerns over a possible Federalist seizure of Fort Adams (as Boston's Fort Independence was then known) as a prelude to Anglo-Federalist cooperation and sought the arrest of printers of Federalist newspapers.

On November 23, 1814, Gerry fell seriously ill while visiting Joseph Nourse of the Treasury Department, and he died not long after returning to his home in the Seven Buildings. He is buried in the Congressional Cemetery in Washington, D.C., with a memorial by John Frazee. He is the only signer of the Declaration of Independence who was buried in the nation's capital city. The estate he left his wife and children was rich in land and poor in cash, but he had managed to repay his brother's debts with his pay as vice president. Aged 68 at the start of his vice presidency, he was the oldest person to become vice president until Charles Curtis in 1929.

Legacy

Gerry is generally remembered for the use of his name in the word gerrymander, for his refusal to sign the United States Constitution, and for his role in the XYZ Affair.  His path through the politics of the age has been difficult to characterize. Early biographers, including his son-in-law James T. Austin and Samuel Eliot Morison, struggled to explain his apparent changes in position.  Biographer George Athan Billias posits that Gerry was a consistent advocate and practitioner of republicanism as it was originally envisioned, and that his role in the Constitutional Convention had a significant impact on the document it eventually produced.

Gerry had ten children, of whom nine survived into adulthood:
 Catharine Gerry (1787–1850)
 Eliza Gerry (1791–1882)
 Ann Gerry (1791–1883)
 Elbridge Gerry, Jr. (1793–1867)
 Thomas Russell Gerry (1794–1848), who married Hannah Green Goelet (1804–1845)
 Helen Maria Gerry (1796–1864)
 James Thompson Gerry (1797–1854), who left West Point upon his father's death and was Commander of the war-sloop USS Albany; the sloop disappeared with all hands September 28 or 29, 1854 near the West Indies.
 Eleanor Stanford Gerry (1800–1871)
 Emily Louisa Gerry (1802–1894)

Gerry's grandson Elbridge Thomas Gerry became a distinguished lawyer and philanthropist in New York. His great-grandson, Peter G. Gerry, was a member of the U.S. House of Representatives and later a U.S. Senator from Rhode Island.

Gerry is depicted in two of John Trumbull's paintings, the Declaration of Independence and General George Washington Resigning His Commission. Both are on view in the rotunda of the United States Capitol.

The upstate New York town of Elbridge is believed to have been named in his honor, as is the western New York town of Gerry. The town of Phillipston, Massachusetts was originally incorporated in 1786 under the name Gerry in his honor but was changed to its present name after the town submitted a petition in 1812, citing Democratic-Republican support for the War of 1812.

Gerry's Landing Road in Cambridge, Massachusetts, is located near the Eliot Bridge not far from Elmwood.  During the 19th century, the area was known as Gerry's Landing (formerly known as Sir Richard's Landing) and was used by a Gerry relative for a short time as a landing and storehouse. The supposed house of his birth, the Elbridge Gerry House (it is uncertain whether he was born in the house currently standing on the site or an earlier structure) stands in Marblehead, and Marblehead's Elbridge Gerry School is named in his honor.

See also
 Memorial to the 56 Signers of the Declaration of Independence

Notes

References

Bibliography
 
   Volume 2 Austin was Gerry's son-in-law.
 
 
 
 
 
 
 
 
 
 
 
 
 
  (five volume history of Massachusetts until the early 20th century)
 
 
 
 
 
 
  Shows that Gerry ignored Jefferson's 1799 letter inviting him to switch parties.

Further reading
 
 Billias, George. Elbridge Gerry: Founding Father and Republican Statesman. New York: McGraw-Hill Book Company, 1976.

External links

 
 Biography by Rev. Charles A. Goodrich, 1856
 A New Nation Votes: American Election Returns 1787–1825
 Delegates to the Constitutional Convention: Massachusetts (Brief Biography of Gerry)
 Gerry family archive at Hartwick College
Elbridge Gerry, the Unfairly Maligned Revolutionary at New England Historical Society

|-

|-

|-

|-

|-

 
 
    

1744 births
1814 deaths
Founding Fathers of the United States
18th-century American politicians
19th-century vice presidents of the United States
1812 United States vice-presidential candidates
American people of English descent
Burials at the Congressional Cemetery
Continental Congressmen from Massachusetts
Democratic-Republican Party state governors of the United States
Democratic-Republican Party vice presidents of the United States
Fellows of the American Academy of Arts and Sciences
Governors of Massachusetts
Harvard College alumni
Gerry family
Gerrymandering in the United States
Madison administration cabinet members
Massachusetts Democratic-Republicans
Members of the United States House of Representatives from Massachusetts
People from Marblehead, Massachusetts
People of colonial Massachusetts
People of the Quasi-War
Politicians from Cambridge, Massachusetts
Signers of the Articles of Confederation
Signers of the United States Declaration of Independence
Vice presidents of the United States